XO-1 is a magnitude 11 G-type main-sequence star located approximately 536 light-years away in the constellation Corona Borealis. XO-1 has a mass and radius similar to the Sun.
In 2006 the extrasolar planet XO-1b was discovered orbiting XO-1 by the transit method using the XO Telescope.

The star XO-1 is named Moldoveanu. The name was selected in the NameExoWorlds campaign by Romania, during the 100th anniversary of the IAU. Moldoveanu is the highest peak in Romania.

Planetary system
The XO Project is an international team of professional and amateur astronomers which discovered the Jupiter-sized planet orbiting around XO-1. The team, led by Peter R. McCullough of the Space Telescope Science Institute in Baltimore, includes four amateur astronomers from North America and Europe. The planet was confirmed using the Harlan J. Smith Telescope and Hobby-Eberly Telescope at McDonald Observatory of the University of Texas. An independent confirmation of the planet was made by the Wide Angle Search for Planets project.  In 2019, the planet was named Negoiu, after Negoiu Peak in Romania.

Further observations with the NICMOS instrument on board the Hubble Space Telescope detected the presence of water vapor, methane, and carbon dioxide in the atmosphere of XO-1b. However an independent reinvestigation of the same data was unable to reproduce these results.

See also
 List of transiting extrasolar planets

References

External links
 SpaceDaily: Astronomers Catch Planet By Unusual Means (May 19, 2006)
 

Corona Borealis
G-type main-sequence stars
Planetary transit variables
Planetary systems with one confirmed planet